Andrei Ionescu (born 29 March 1988 in Craiova) is a Romanian footballer who plays as an attacking midfielder.

Club career

Universitatea Craiova
Ionescu is a product of Universitatea Craiova's youth system and has been a regular player for them. Rising through the ranks, he became captain of the side on several occasions. His talent caught the attention of Dutch club PSV in 2004, where he spent one season in their academy. Ionescu has a lot of qualities his great passes and acceleration goes along with good dribbling attributes. He is also good-working player, who is battling for every ball in his reach.

He made his professional Liga I debut on 27 August 2006 in a 0–4 loss to Dinamo București. In his three seasons at Craiova, he played 54 matches and scored 4 goals.

Steaua București
On 24 August 2008, he signed a five-year contract with Steaua București. He is in co-ownership with Universitatea Craiova. The following two seasons saw Ionescu in and out of the squad, making only 18 league and cup appearances during the two years, mostly from the substitutes bench. After the arrival of new manager Cristiano Bergodi, Ionescu became a regular starter for Steaua in the 2009–10 Europa League season. He made his European debut on 16 July 2009 against Hungarian side Újpest in a 2–0 win. Struggling for first team opportunities, Ionescu was sent out on loan to Politehnica Iaşi on 10 February 2010 until the summer. During the 2010 summer transfer window, he was close to sign a loan deal with Turkish side Mersin İdmanyurdu. However, the transfer failed. In the winter of 2010–11 season, Ionescu was demoted to the B squad.

In June 2011, Ionescu left Steaua.

Royal Antwerp

On 31 August 2011, the free agent signed a two-year contract with Belgian side Royal Antwerp.

Ferencváros Budapest
On 30 August 2012 he signed a contract with the Hungarian record champion Ferencváros Budapest.

Later years 
In February 2016, 28-year-old Ionescu signed a four-month contract with Dutch Eerste Divisie club Eindhoven. In January 2017, he returned to Romania after six years by penning a deal with Voluntari.

Aizawl
Ionescu switched clubs and countries in August and signed for Indian I-League club Aizawl FC. He scored a goal in the 2018 AFC Champions League qualifying play-offs against Zob Ahan and became the first player to score a goal for Aizawl in any continental competitions. Ionescu's powerful right-footer from the centre of the box beat Zob Ahan goalkeeper Mohammad Mazaheri after he connected cross delivered by Laldinliana Renthlei.

International career
Ionescu has played for Romania since the U-19 level and made his debut in September 2006 in a 4–2 win over Belgium. On 22 February 2006, he made his debut for the Romania U-21 squad in a friendly against Turkey.

Honours
Steaua București
Romanian Cup: 2010–11
Ferencváros
Hungarian League Cup: 2012–13
Voluntari
Romanian Cup: 2016–17

References

External links
 
 

1988 births
Living people
Sportspeople from Craiova
Romanian footballers
Association football midfielders
FC U Craiova 1948 players
FC Steaua București players
FC Steaua II București players
FC Politehnica Iași (1945) players
Royal Antwerp F.C. players
Ferencvárosi TC footballers
FC Eindhoven players
ASIL Lysi players
FC Voluntari players
Aizawl FC players
FC Metaloglobus București players
Liga I players
Challenger Pro League players
Eerste Divisie players
Nemzeti Bajnokság I players
I-League players
Cypriot Second Division players
Liga II players
Romanian expatriate footballers
Expatriate footballers in Belgium
Expatriate footballers in Hungary
Expatriate footballers in Cyprus
Romanian expatriate sportspeople in Belgium
Romanian expatriate sportspeople in Hungary
Romanian expatriate sportspeople in Cyprus
Expatriate footballers in India
Romanian expatriate sportspeople in India